Mond protected area is a  plain and desert protected area on the Persian Gulf coast of the Bord Khun District, Deyr County, Bushehr Province in southern Iran. The protected area was established in 1976. The Mond River empties into the Persian Gulf in the northern part of the area.

References

Protected areas of Iran
Geography of Bushehr Province
Protected areas established in 1976
1976 establishments in Iran